Crease Island, formerly Lewis Island, is an island in the Broughton Archipelago Marine Provincial Park in the Queen Charlotte Strait-Johnstone Strait region of the Central Coast of British Columbia, Canada.  It is located north of Harbledown Island and is at the southern extremity of the provincial park.

Name origin
The name Lewis Island was changed to Crease Island in 1905 to commemorate Sir Henry Pering Pellew Crease, (1823-1905).  He emigrated to the Crown Colony of Vancouver Island in 1858 and served as  Attorney-General for ten years (1861-1971) before being appointed to the Supreme Court of British Columbia, retiring after 25 years, in 1895, with a knighthood.  He died February 27, 1905.

References

Islands of British Columbia
Central Coast of British Columbia